Le schpountz is a 1999 French film directed by Gérard Oury (a remake of the 1938 film Heartbeat by Marcel Pagnol). Irénée does not want to work in his uncle's grocery shop and spends his time dreaming of becoming an actor. Irénée's chance comes when a crew of movie makers came to his little village. Irénée begins to go overboard to get noticed, which earns him the traditional joke reserved to a "schpountz" (naive person): a phoney contract and a departure for Paris.

References

External links 

1999 comedy films
1999 films
Films based on works by Marcel Pagnol
Films directed by Gérard Oury
Films set in New York City
French comedy films
1990s French-language films
Remakes of French films
1990s French films